Black Ingvars is a Swedish humorist heavy metal group. Black Ingvars is famous for cover versions of songs from other musical styles, like pop, children's song (including "Sjörövar Fabbe" and "Här kommer Pippi Långstrump"), dansband music, Christmas songs and gospel. They finished fifth in the Swedish Melodifestivalen 1998 with the song "Cherie".

Bassist Henrik Ohlin died in May 2021.

Discography
 1995 - Earcandy Six
 1995 - Earcandy Five
 1997 - Sjung Och Var Glad Med Black-Ingvars
 1998 - Schlager Metal 
 1999 - Heaven Metal
 2000 - Kids Superhits
 2000 - The Very Best of dansbandshårdrock
 2002 - Sjung Och Var Glad Med Black-Ingvars 2

References

External links
 Band website
 
  Television appearance

Swedish heavy metal musical groups
Musical groups established in 1995
1995 establishments in Sweden
Melodifestivalen contestants of 1998